Kick Groot (born 5 April 1998) is a Dutch footballer who plays as a central defender for ODIN '59 in the Derde Divisie. He is related to 1960s Ajax star, Henk Groot.

Club career
He made his Eerste Divisie debut for Jong AZ on 25 August 2017 in a game against RKC Waalwijk.

Groot moved to SC Telstar in April 2018. He would be plagued by injuries during his time at the club, only making nine league appearances during his three-year stint.

On 3 September 2021, Groot signed with ODIN '59 in the Derde Divisie after his contract with Telstar expired.

References

External links
 

1998 births
Footballers from Zaanstad
Living people
Dutch footballers
AZ Alkmaar players
SC Telstar players
Eerste Divisie players
Derde Divisie players
Association football defenders